The Vanwall Grand Prix cars are a series of open-wheel Formula One race cars, designed, developed and built by British manufacturer Vanwall, for Formula One racing, between 1954 and 1960.

Gallery

Formula One World Championship results
(key)

Non-championship Formula One results
(key)

Notes

References

Formula One cars